Ulva ohnoi is a species of light-green coloured seaweed in the family Ulvaceae that is endemic to Japan.

Description

References

Further reading

Ulvaceae
Plants described in 2004
Endemic flora of Japan
Flora of Asia